Buraki or Bowraki may refer to:
 Buraki, Kavar, Fars Province, Iran
 Buraki-ye Olya, Kazerun County, Fars Province, Iran
 Buraki-ye Sofla, Kazerun County, Fars Province, Iran
 Buraki, Marvdasht, Fars Province, Iran
 Buraki, Poland